Jumai Khan Azad
Harivansh Rai Bachchan
Swadesh Bharati
Bhikhari Das
Kripalu Maharaj
Sumitranandan Pant
Nazish Pratapgarhi
Kunwar Suresh Singh
Tara Singh (author)
Mohsin Zaidi
Imran Pratapgarhi
Shahzada Kaleem

Gallery

See also 
 List of people from Pratapgarh
 List of people from Uttar Pradesh
 Pratapgarh district, Uttar Pradesh

Notes 

Poets from Uttar Pradesh
Poets from Pratapgarh
People from Pratapgarh, Uttar Pradesh
Lists of Indian poets